Gayeshpur Padmalochan High School is surrounded by the open natural environment of Gayeshpur village adjacent to Jinardi railway station at the southeastern end of Palash upazila at the western end of Narsingdi district town in Bangladesh. It was the last recognized high school before the partition of the country under Calcutta University in 1947.

History 
Babu Prakash Chowdhury, a prominent zamindar of Gayeshpur Pargana, was established in 1933 as a minor school in Barachar Mouza of Gayeshpur after his late grandfather Babu Padmalochan Chowdhury. Which was introduced as a secondary school in 1948. On 13 August 1947, Gayeshpur was recognized as a Padmalochan High School by Calcutta University.

Number of students (by class) 
Class Number of Students 6th Branch: 362, 8th Branch: 237, 8th Branch: 202, 9th Branch: 161, 10th Branch: 148.

Test pass rate 
 SSC - Pass rate: 72.62%,
 JSC - Pass rate: 8.12%

Future plans 
To start educational activities of class XI-XII.

Management Committee Information 
Regular Managing Committee, Total number of members in the committee = 12 (including two female members)

References

Schools in Bangladesh
Education in Bangladesh